Andrew Newmark (born July 14, 1950) is an American session drummer who was a member of Sly and the Family Stone and has played with George Harrison, John Lennon, Pink Floyd, David Bowie, Ron Wood and Roxy Music.

Biography
Andrew Newmark was born on July 14, 1950, in Port Chester, New York, and raised primarily in the nearby suburb of Mamaroneck. His mother was Bermudian and his father, Charles W. Newmark, was an Assistant District Attorney from 1938 to 1940 in New York City under District Attorney Thomas E. Dewey. His Father was Russian-Jewish. Taking up the drums at the age of nine, Newmark gradually honed his craft and was taking paid gigs at age 15. Visiting his mother's native Bermuda frequently throughout his youth, Newmark made the decision to move there at the age of 16. Newmark played in the Bermuda Jam, a band that included guitarist Paul Muggleton.

One of his first gigs was recording with Carly Simon on her albums Anticipation and No Secrets. These and other sessions segued into a more permanent role as a member of the funk band Sly and the Family Stone from 1972 to 1973. Hired to replace Gerry Gibson, who had replaced founding member Greg Errico, Newmark was invited to audition for Sly Stone by saxophonist Pat Rizzo. Newmark went on to record one album, Fresh (1973), as the Family Stone's drummer and performed with the band for two years in concert.

After leaving Family Stone in 1974, Newmark played drums for the first month of George Harrison and Ravi Shankar's 1974 North American tour, and returned to session work, playing drums on Gary Wright's 1975 album Dream Weaver. He continued performing on Carly Simon's solo albums throughout the 1970s and again in the 1990s. Newmark has performed and recorded with John Lennon, Cat Stevens, Joe Walsh, B.B. King, Eric Clapton, David Bowie, Roy Buchanan, Bryan Ferry, Dan Fogelberg, George Harrison, Rickie Lee Jones, Patrick Moraz, Randy Newman, Pink Floyd, Roger Waters, David Gilmour, Murray Head, Keith Richards, Rod Stewart, Luther Vandross, Ronnie Wood, Roxy Music, ABC, Hue and Cry, Laura Nyro, Nicolette Larson, Elkie Brooks, Sting, Steve Winwood, Nils Lofgren, George Benson, and Michael Franks.

In 1980, Newmark was the drummer on John Lennon's last album, Double Fantasy, as well as Milk and Honey released in 1984. He was the featured drummer on Yoko Ono's Season of Glass in 1981. His connection with the Double Fantasy album was reprised in 2012 with his contributions to the Lennon Bermuda tribute album on several tracks, including those by Paul Carrack, Bryan Ferry, Nils Lofgren, and Rocky and the Natives.

According to a 2006 Sound on Sound magazine interview with engineer Andy Jackson, Newmark played drums on David Gilmour's On an Island album. Newmark also plays on several tracks on David Gilmour's 2015 solo album Rattle That Lock.

Equipment
Newmark uses Yamaha drums, Remo drum heads, Zildjian cymbals and Vic Firth drumsticks.  His drum setup and cymbals vary slightly with who he plays with, but generally favors a setup consisting of a bass drum, rack tom, snare drum, and then one or two floor toms.  He plays a mix of Zildjian A and K cymbals.

Drums: Yamaha Recording Custom and Tour Custom Series: 
 16"x24" bass drum 
 8"x12" rack tom 
 16"x16" floor tom 
 

Cymbals: Zildjian: 
 13" A new beat hi-hats or 14" A new beat hi-hats 
 8" A splash
 16" A rock crash or 17" A thin crash
 18" A thin crash 
 20" A medium ride or 20" K ride or 20" K Constantinople ride 

Drumheads: Remo 
 Yamaha variation of Remo drumheads 

Drumsticks: Vic Firth: 
 Vic Firth 5A drumsticks

Discography

With Carly Simon
 Anticipation (1971)
 No Secrets (1972)
 Hotcakes (1974)
 Playing Possum (1975)
 Another Passenger (1976)
 This is My Life (1992)
 Letters Never Sent (1994)
With Sly and the Family Stone
 Fresh (EPIC, 1973)
With Badfinger
 Airwaves (1979)
With James Taylor
 Gorilla (1975)
With John Lennon and Yoko Ono
 Double Fantasy (1980)
 Milk and Honey (1984)
With George Harrison
 Dark Horse (1974)
 Extra Texture (Read All About It) (1975)
 George Harrison (1979)
With Carole King
 Wrap Around Joy (1974)
With Ronnie Wood
 I've Got My Own Album to Do (1974)
 Now Look (1975)
 Not for Beginners (2001)
 The First Barbarians: Live from Kilburn (1974 but only issued in 2007/Wooden)
With David Bowie
 Young Americans (1975)
With Gary Wright
 The Dream Weaver (1975)
With Rickie Lee Jones
 Rickie Lee Jones (1979)
With Lalo Schifrin
Black Widow(1976) (CTI)
With Gloria Gaynor
 Gloria Gaynor (1982)
With Stephen Bishop
 Red Cab to Manhattan (1980)
With B.B. King
 Deuces Wild (1997)
With Eric Clapton
 Nothing but the Blues (1995, 2022)
With George Benson
 In Concert-Carnegie Hall (1975)
 Good King Bad (1975)
 Benson & Farrell with Joe Farrell (1976)
 Pacific Fire (1983)
With Bob James
 Three (1976)
With Neil Larsen
 Jungle Fever (1978)
With Sting
 ...Nothing Like the Sun (1987)
With Patti Austin
 End of a Rainbow (1976)
With Murray Head
 Voice (1981)
With Yoko Ono
 Season of Glass (1981)
With Patrick Moraz
 The Story of I - side 2 (1976)
With Hank Crawford
 Hank Crawford's Back (1976)
With Gene Parsons
 Kindling (1973)
With Irene Cara
 Anyone Can See (1982)
With Cheryl Lynn
 In Love (1979)
With Bill LaBounty
 Bill LaBounty (1982)
With Laura Nyro
 Nested (1978)
With Michael Franks
 Objects of Desire (1982)
 Skin Dive (1985)
With Urbie Green
 The Fox (1976)
With Paul Carrack
 Nightbird (1980)
 Blue Views (1995)
 Satisfy My Soul (2001)
With Joe Walsh
 You Can't Argue with a Sick Mind (1976)
With Elkie Brooks
 Shooting Star (1978)
With Stevie Nicks
 Rock a Little (1985)
With Ron Davies
 U.F.O. (1973)
With John Martyn
 One World (1977)
With Richie Havens
 Connections (1980)
With Mark Farner
 No Frills (1978)
With Dan Fogelberg
 Phoenix (1979)
 Exiles (1987)
With Randy Newman
 Good Old Boys (1974)
 Little Criminals (1977)
 Born Again (1979)
With Mary Chapin Carpenter
 Come On Come On (1992)
With David "Fathead" Newman
 Mr. Fathead (1976)
With Cat Stevens
 Izitso (1977)
With Roxy Music
 Flesh and Blood (1980)
 Avalon (1982)
 The High Road (1983)
With ABC
 Beauty Stab (1983)
With Rod Stewart
 Smiler (1974)
 Atlantic Crossing (1975)
 A Night on the Town (1976)
With Carole Bayer Sager
 Carole Bayer Sager (1977)
With Pink Floyd
 The Final Cut (1983) 
With Roger Waters
 The Pros and Cons of Hitch Hiking (1984)
With Michael Bolton
 Michael Bolotin (1975)
With Judie Tzuke
 The Cat Is Out (1985)
 Under the Angels (1996)
 Secret Agent (1998)
With David Gilmour
 On an Island (2006)
 Rattle That Lock (2015)
With Bryan Ferry
 Boys and Girls (1985)
 Bête Noire (1987)
 Taxi (1993)
 As Time Goes By (1999)
 Frantic (2002)
 Dylanesque (2007)
 Olympia (2010)
 Avonmore (2014)

References

External links 
Official website
Andy Newmark interview. Keef Trouble interviews Andy Newmark.

1950 births
American expatriates in the United Kingdom
American funk drummers
American male drummers
Rhythm and blues drummers
American rock drummers
Sly and the Family Stone members
Roxy Music members
American soul musicians
ABC (band) members
Living people
People from Port Chester, New York
American people of Bermudian descent
American people of Russian-Jewish descent
American session musicians
Soul drummers
20th-century American drummers